A list of films produced by the Sandalwood (Kannada language film industry) based in Bangalore in the year 2009.

Released films 
Films are listed based on release dates.

See also 
 List of Kannada films of 2010
 List of Kannada films of 2008
 Cinema of Karnataka

External links 
 Kannada films of 2009 at the Internet Movie Database

2009
Lists of 2009 films by country or language
2009 in Indian cinema